Don Juan Manuel's Tales of Count Lucanor, in Spanish Libro de los ejemplos del conde Lucanor y de Patronio (Book of the Examples of Count Lucanor and of Patronio), also commonly known as El Conde Lucanor, Libro de Patronio, or Libro de los ejemplos (original Old Castilian: Libro de los enxiemplos del Conde Lucanor et de Patronio), is one of the earliest works of prose in Castilian Spanish. It was first written in 1335.

The book is divided into four parts. The first and most well-known part is a series of 51 short stories (some no more than a page or two) drawn from various sources, such as Aesop and other classical writers, and Arabic folktales.

Tales of Count Lucanor was first printed in 1575 when it was published at Seville under the auspices of Argote de Molina. It was again printed at Madrid in 1642, after which it lay forgotten for nearly two centuries.

Purpose and structure

A didactic, moralistic purpose, which would color so much of the Spanish literature to follow (see Novela picaresca), is the mark of this book. Count Lucanor engages in conversation with his advisor Patronio, putting to him a problem ("Some man has made me a proposition..." or "I fear that such and such person intends to...") and asking for advice. Patronio responds always with the greatest humility, claiming not to wish to offer advice to so illustrious a person as the Count, but offering to tell him a story of which the Count's problem reminds him. (Thus, the stories are "examples" [ejemplos] of wise action.) At the end he advises the Count to do as the protagonist of his story did.

Each chapter ends in more or less the same way, with slight variations on: "And this pleased the Count greatly and he did just so, and found it well. And Don Johán (Juan) saw that this example was very good, and had it written in this book, and composed the following verses." A rhymed couplet closes, giving the moral of the story.

Origin of stories and influence on later literature
Many of the stories written in the book are the first examples written in a modern European language of various stories, which many other writers would use in the succeeding centuries. Many of the stories he included were themselves derived from other stories, coming from western and Arab sources.

Shakespeare's The Taming of the Shrew has the basic elements of Tale 35, "What Happened to a Young Man Who Married a Strong and Ill-tempered Woman".

Tale 32, "What Happened to the King and the Tricksters Who Made Cloth" tells the story that Hans Christian Andersen made popular as The Emperor's New Clothes.

Story 7, "What Happened to a Woman Named Truhana", a version of Aesop's The Milkmaid and Her Pail, was claimed by Max Müller to originate in the Hindu cycle Panchatantra.

Tale 2, "What happened to a good Man and his Son, leading a beast to market," is the familiar fable The miller, his son and the donkey.

In 2016, Baroque Decay released a game under the name "The Count Lucanor". As well as some protagonists' names, certain events from the books inspired past events in the game.

The stories

The book opens with a prologue which introduces the characters of the Count and Patronio. The titles in the following list are those given in Keller and Keating's 1977 translation into English. James York's 1868 translation into English gives a significantly different ordering of the stories and omits the fifty-first.

 What Happened to a King and His Favorite 
 What Happened to a Good Man and His Son 
 How  King Richard of England Leapt into the Sea against the Moors
 What a Genoese Said to His Soul When He Was about to Die 
 What Happened to a Fox and a Crow Who Had a Piece of Cheese in His Beak
 How the Swallow Warned the Other Birds When She Saw Flax Being Sown 
 What Happened to a Woman Named Truhana 
 What Happened to a Man Whose Liver Had to Be Washed 
 What Happened to Two Horses Which Were Thrown to the Lion 
 What Happened to a Man Who on Account of Poverty and Lack of Other Food Was Eating Bitter Lentils 
 What Happened to a Dean of  Santiago de Compostela and Don Yllán, the Grand Master of Toledo
 What Happened to the Fox and the Rooster 
 What Happened to a Man Who Was Hunting Partridges 
 The Miracle of Saint Dominick When He Preached against the Usurer 
 What Happened to Lorenzo Suárez at the Siege of Seville 
 The Reply that count Fernán González Gave to His Relative Núño Laynes 
 What Happened to a Very Hungry Man Who Was Half-heartedly Invited to Dinner 
 What Happened to Pero Meléndez de Valdés When He Broke His Leg 
 What Happened to the Crows and the Owls 
 What Happened to a King for Whom a Man Promised to Perform Alchemy 
 What Happened to a Young King and a Philosopher to Whom his Father Commended Him 
 What Happened to the Lion and the Bull 
 How the Ants Provide for Themselves 
 What Happened to the King Who Wanted to Test His Three Sons 
 What Happened to the Count of Provence and How He Was Freed from Prison by the Advice of Saladin
 What Happened to the Tree of Lies 
 What Happened to an Emperor and to  Don Alvarfáñez Minaya and Their Wives 
 What Happened in Granada to Don Lorenzo Suárez Gallinato When He Beheaded the Renegade Chaplain 
 What Happened to a Fox Who Lay down in the Street to Play Dead 
 What Happened to King Abenabet of  Seville and Ramayquía His Wife 
 How a Cardinal Judged between the Canons of Paris and the Friars Minor 
 What Happened to the King and the Tricksters Who Made Cloth 
 What Happened to Don Juan Manuel's Saker Falcon and an Eagle and a Heron 
 What Happened to a Blind Man Who Was Leading Another 
 What Happened to a Young Man Who Married a Strong and Ill-tempered Woman
 What Happened to a Merchant When He Found His Son and His Wife Sleeping Together 
 What Happened to Count Fernán González with His Men after He Had Won the Battle of Hacinas 
 What Happened to a Man Who Was Loaded down with Precious Stones and Drowned in the River 
 What Happened to a Man and a Swallow and a Sparrow 
 Why the Seneschal of Carcassonne Lost His Soul 
 What Happened to a King of Córdova Named Al-Haquem 
 What Happened to a Woman of Sham Piety 
 What Happened to Good and Evil and the Wise Man and the Madman 
 What Happened to Don Pero Núñez the Loyal, to Don Ruy González de Zavallos, and to Don Gutier Roiz de Blaguiello with Don Rodrigo the Generous 
 What Happened to a Man Who Became the Devil's Friend and Vassal 
 What Happened to a Philosopher who by Accident Went down a Street Where Prostitutes Lived 
 What Befell a Moor and His Sister Who Pretended That She Was Timid 
 What Happened to a Man Who Tested His Friends 
 What Happened to the Man Whom They Cast out Naked on an Island When They Took away from Him the Kingdom He Ruled 
 What Happened to Saladin and a Lady, the Wife of a Knight Who Was His Vassal 
 What Happened to a Christian King Who Was Very Powerful and Haughty

Notes

References

Further reading

 Sturm, Harlan

 Wacks, David

External links

The Internet Archive provides free access to the 1868 translation by James York.
JSTOR has the 1977 translation by Keller and Keating.
Selections in English and Spanish (pedagogical edition) with introduction, notes, and bibliography in Open Iberia/América (open access teaching anthology)

14th-century books
Spanish literature
1335 books